Diplomaragnidae is a family of millipedes belonging to the order Chordeumatida. These millipedes range from 9 mm to 24 mm in length and are found from the Volga River region in Russia to Japan and Taiwan. All known adult females in this family have 32 segments (counting the collum as the first segment and the telson as the last) rather than the 30 segments typically found in this order; in most species, adult males also have 32 segments (e.g., Altajosoma kemerovo), but in some species, adult males have only 30 segments (e.g., Diplomaragna reducta).

Genera
Genera:
 Alineuma Mikhaljova, 2021
Altajosoma Gulička, 1972
 Ancestreuma Golovatch, 1977
 Asiatyla Mikhaljova, 1999
 Diplomaragna Attems, 1907
 Koreagna Mikhaljova & Lim, 2008
Litovkia Mikhaljova, 2021
 Maritimosoma Mikhaljova, 1999
 Niponiothauma Verhoeff, 1942
 Orientyla Mikhaljova, 1999
 Pacifiosoma Mikhaljova, 1999
 Pterygostegia Miyosi, 1958
 Sakhalineuma Golovatch, 1976
 Shearia Mikhaljova, 1999
 Syntelopodeuma Verhoeff, 1914
 Tokyosoma Verhoeff, 1929

References

Chordeumatida